Nikos "Nikko" Patrelakis was born in Athens, Greece. He studied music in the National Conservatory and mathematics in the University of Athens.

He releases albums, singles and compilations around the world under the electronica – idm genre through his label Smallhouse Records.

He has composed and produced music for featured films and theatrical plays. Ηe has created musical ids for national TV-stations and major radio-stations, as well as music for hundreds of TV-commercials.

As a dj he has contributed in the evolution of the Greek club scene, participating in the initiation of clubs like X-club, Factory, +Soda in Athens and Cavo Paradiso Club Mykonos in Mykonos as a resident Dj.

In 1999 he co-wrote "Voice" with Paul McCartney that was presented by Heather Mills for the support of the people with kinetic disabilities. That year he released 'Habitat' his first solo album, introducing his unique sound, followed up two years later by "Elements", a continuous play release in a form of a soundtrack, with guests like famous Greek journalist Malvina Karali narrating, and Stamatis Kraounakis, one of the most important Greek contemporary songwriters, improvising on a piano. In 2003 he released the album “TIME”, which stayed for 9 weeks in the official IFPI national top-50. He also composed and produced three themes for the opening and closing ceremonies of the Olympic Games in Athens 2004, performed by him and London Philharmonic Orchestra, for the parade of the Greek flag and the Greek team, in the opening ceremonies, and for the entrance of the athletes of the world in the Olympic Stadium, for the closing ceremonies.
That year he also composed and produced the soundtrack of “Hostage”, directed by Constantine Giannaris, which was the official Greek participation in the Panorama of the Berlinale 2005. The film won the prize for the best direction in the Thessaloniki Film Festival 2005 and candidated for the Helix Award of the European Film Academy.
His last album ‘Echo’ was released worldwide in 2007 and gathered excellent reviews from the press. It included a variety of sounds, from 'Magnet', a fully arranged piece performed by him and the Symphonic Orchestra of the Greek National Television, to "Shortcut", a collaboration with KBhta, to "Voyage" including the narration of French radio producer Louis Bozon. Cinematic ambiences, orchestral elements, deep rhythms and dreamy electric guitars produce a nu-jazz aroma with an electronic accent, that is the characteristic sound of Nikko Patrelakis.

He has participated in several exhibitions as a visual artist and in 2008 he made his first personal photography exhibition in Athens under the title "Ec(h)o".

Currently he is recording his new album, due to release 2010.

External links

Berlin 2005,

Living people
Musicians from Athens
Greek composers
Year of birth missing (living people)